This is a timeline of Finnish history. To read about the background of these events, see History of Finland.

BC

1st millennium

13th century

14th century

15th century

16th century

17th century

18th century

19th century

20th century

21st century

See also 
Finland
History of Finland
History of Sweden
History of Russia
Soviet Union
Timeline of Helsinki
Timeline of Swedish history
Timeline of Russian history
List of presidents of Finland

References 

Timeline of Finnish history
Timelines by country